Belda railway station is a railway station on Kharagpur–Puri line, part of the Howrah–Chennai main line under Kharagpur railway division of South Eastern Railway zone. Earlier this station was known as Contai Road. It is situated beside Shahid Khudiram Sarani at Belda in Paschim Medinipur district in the Indian state of West Bengal.

History
In between 1893 and 1896 the East Coast State Railway constructed Howrah–Chennai main line. Kharagpur–Puri branch was finally opened for public in 1901. The route was electrified in several phases. In 2005, Howrah–Chennai route was completely electrified.

References

Railway stations in Paschim Medinipur district
Kharagpur railway division